Pankratov is a Russian surname. People with this surname include:
B. I. Pankratov (1892–1979), Russian linguist
Denis Pankratov (born 1974), Russian swimmer
Nikolay Pankratov (born 1982), Russian cross-country skier

In its feminine form Pankratova:
Svetlana Pankratova (born 1971), declared by the Guinness Book of World Records to have the longest legs of any woman

Russian-language surnames
Patronymic surnames
Surnames from given names